Local nature reserves (LNRs) in England are designated by local authorities under Section 21 of the National Parks and Access to the Countryside Act 1949. LNRs are sites which have a special local interest either biologically or geologically. Local authorities have a duty to care for them, and must control the sites by owning or leasing them, or by having an agreement with the owners.  The local authorities can apply local byelaws to manage and protect LNRs.

As of February 2020, there are fifteen LNRs in Oxfordshire, a county in South East England with an area of 2,605 square kilometres and a population of 648,700.

Key

Other designations and wildlife trust management 
GCR = Geological Conservation Review site
SSSI = Site of Special Scientific Interest

Sites

See also
List of Sites of Special Scientific Interest in Oxfordshire
Berkshire, Buckinghamshire and Oxfordshire Wildlife Trust

Notes

References

 
Oxfordshire
Local Nature Reserves